Laurie Ellis (born 7 November 1979, in Edinburgh) is a Scottish football coach and former professional footballer. Ellis played for Raith Rovers over three spells, St Mirren, Cowdenbeath and Stirling Albion. As a coach, he has twice served as caretaker manager at Dundee United and was appointed Queen's Park manager in May 2021, before being released in December.

Playing career
Ellis started his senior career with Raith Rovers after joining from Edinburgh amateur club Links United. Ellis debuted on 12 December 1998 versus Greenock Morton in the Scottish First Division. Ellis made over 90 appearances for the Kirkcaldy club during his first spell and scored his first league goal on 25 November 2000 in a defeat versus Ayr United.

Ellis remained at the Fife club until 2003, when he signed for St Mirren. Ellis debuted on 2 August 2003 versus Queen's Park in the Scottish League Challenge Cup and stayed with the Paisley club for two seasons, before leaving at the end of the 2004–05 season when his contract expired. After being released by the Buddies, Ellis returned to his former club at Stark's Park, debuting for a second time on 30 July 2005 versus Elgin City in the Scottish League Challenge Cup. Ellis remained at the Kirkcaldy club for one season before joining their local Fife rivals Cowdenbeath, whose manager was his former St Mirren team-mate Mixu Paatelainen.

Ellis debuted for the Blue Brazil on 5 August 2006 versus Alloa Athletic in the Scottish Second Division and went on to feature in all but four of their matches during the 2006–07 season, scoring six goals. At the end of the season he returned to play in the First Division, after signing for newly promoted Stirling Albion on 1 June 2007. Ellis debuted for the Binos on 4 August 2007 versus Partick Thistle. During May 2008, Ellis returned for a third spell at Stark's Park, after one season at Forthbank . During August 2010, Ellis played his 250th match for Raith Rovers and on 15 October 2011 Ellis played his 300th game, scoring in a 2–0 win over the Harry Wraggs.

Management and coaching
In July 2012, Ellis took up a role as first-team coach at Raith, as well as continuing as a player. In May 2016, he moved to Dundee United as assistant manager to Ray McKinnon. In October 2017, when McKinnon departed the club, Ellis was appointed caretaker manager. Ellis stayed on at United as assistant manager to Csaba László. On 30 September 2018, Ellis was appointed caretaker manager for a second occasion, after László departed the Terrors. Ellis was also assistant manager to Robbie Neilson at Tannadice for a brief spell until Neilson got his backroom team organised.

Ellis was appointed as assistant manager to Gary Naysmith at Queen of the South in March 2019, but left the club two months later when Naysmith was sacked. After working for a time alongside Keith Wright at one of the Scottish Football Association Performance Schools, he joined Queen's Park as assistant manager in January 2020, once again working under McKinnon.

Ellis was appointed as Head Coach of Queen's Park on 21 May 2021, replacing former Head Coach Ray McKinnon. On 31 December, Ellis was relieved of his duties as manager following a downturn in form.

Managerial statistics

Honours

Raith Rovers
Scottish Second Division: 2
 2002–03, 2008–09

References

External links

1979 births
Footballers from Edinburgh
Living people
Raith Rovers F.C. players
St Mirren F.C. players
Cowdenbeath F.C. players
Stirling Albion F.C. players
Scottish footballers
Scottish Football League players
Association football defenders
Scottish Professional Football League players
Dundee United F.C. non-playing staff
Queen's Park F.C. non-playing staff
Raith Rovers F.C. non-playing staff
Queen's Park F.C. managers
Scottish football managers
Scottish Professional Football League managers